Corylus heterophylla, the Asian hazel, is a species of hazel native to eastern Asia in northern and central China, Korea, Japan, and southeastern Siberia.

It is very similar to the closely related common hazel (C. avellana) of Europe and western Asia, differing in the leaves being somewhat more lobed.

Uses
The nut is edible, and is very similar to the common hazel nut; it is cultivated commercially in China.

References

heterophylla
Edible nuts and seeds
Plants described in 1844
Flora of Asia
Trees of China
Trees of Japan
Trees of Korea
Trees of Siberia
Flora of Primorsky Krai